Microblepsis acuminata is a moth in the family Drepanidae. It was described by John Henry Leech in 1890. It is found in the Chinese provinces of Hubei and Shaanxi and in Japan.

The wingspan is about 39 mm. Adults are pale reddish brown, the apex of the forewings blackish and two dark brown lines transverse the disc of the wing. The first is deflected to the median nervurem then inflected to the inner margin and the second runs from the costa towards the outer margin, where it joins a darker apical streak. There is also an obscure submarginal line and two small black central spots. The hindwings have two central dark brown lines, the first curved and the second straight. There is also slightly wavy dark brown submarginal line.

References

Moths described in 1890
Drepaninae